This is the complete Chapter and Colony Roll of the Society of Xi Sigma Pi, an Honor society for Forestry and related sciences. Active chapters noted in bold, inactive chapters noted with italics. Unless otherwise indicated, chapter information is from the national website.

List of chapters

References
All chapter locations and designations from The Society of Xi Sigma Pi's 1993 Bylaws, and History, accessed 15 June, 2014, or from Baird's Manual of American College Fraternities with the exception of Alpha Phi Chapter and Alpha Chi Chapter, which were found via Google search.

External links

Forestry organizations
Honor societies
Lists of chapters of United States student societies by society